McDougall Lake is a lake in Wells Gray Provincial Park in east-central British Columbia, Canada. It drains through File Creek into Murtle Lake.

Naming
McDougall Lake and McDougall Falls on the Murtle River were named for Pete McDougal who homesteaded in the Clearwater River Valley from 1913 to 1936. The different spelling of these names has evolved over the years.

Access
There is no road or trail to McDougall Lake. Some maps show a trail from Murtle Lake up File Creek, but it has been impassable since the 1980s. The Kostal Lake trail from Clearwater Lake was permanently closed by B.C. Parks in 2013. Float planes and helicopters are allowed to land at McDougall Lake with a permit from B.C. Parks.

The creek is impassable at a log jam, and a flagged route starts here.

References

Lakes of British Columbia
Interior of British Columbia
Wells Gray-Clearwater
Kamloops Division Yale Land District